Valley is an unincorporated community in Butler Township, Columbiana County, Ohio, United States.

History
Valley was platted in 1810. The community was named for the creek valley in which the town site is situated. A post office called Valley was established in 1868, and remained in operation until 1901.

References

Unincorporated communities in Columbiana County, Ohio
1810 establishments in Ohio
Populated places established in 1810
Unincorporated communities in Ohio